The minute noctuid moth (Helicoverpa minuta) was a species of moth in the family Noctuidae.

It was endemic to the Hawaiian Islands.

References

Endemic moths of Hawaii
Taxonomy articles created by Polbot
Extinct Hawaiian animals
Extinct moths
Extinct insects since 1500